Vershina is a village in the Irkutsk Oblast, Russia, within the Bokhansky District, Ust-Orda Buryat Okrug, in the municipality of Sharalday. In 2012 it was inhabited by 329 people, most of whom were of Polish descent.

History 

The village was established in 1910 by Polish immigrants from Congress Poland, mostly originating from the regions of the Lesser Poland, and Dąbrowa Basin. The settlers were encouraged to move there by the promise of receiving 15 dessiatins of land and 100 rubles. The area was inhabited by the native population of Buryats, who helped settlers in the first years of the settlement. Both populations kept good relations with each other.

In 1915 in the village was opened the St. Stanislaus Church. It functioned until 1928, or 1929, when the Soviet administration decided to demolish it. Thanks to the protest of local population, it never happened, however the church still remained closed, and its interiors devastated. In 1938, during the Great Purge, 30 inhabitants of the village were executed by NKVD officers. During the Soviet era, population was also forced into the russification, having to hide speaking Polish or practicing their Catholic religion. Despite that, the population kept their language and religion, still practicing both to this day. Following the fall of the Soviet Union, the local church reopened in 1992.

Currently, the village is a tourist attraction among tourists from Poland, fascinated by the presence of Polish population in Siberia. In 2019, in the village was placed the memorial plaque with the names of the original settlers of the village, to commemorate their memory. In 2021, the village was visited by Krzysztof Krajewski, the ambassador of Poland to Russia.

Demographics

Population

Ethnicity 
The village is inhabited by people of Polish, Buryat, and Russian identity, with majority being Polish.

Language 
The local languages spoken by the population are Russian, Polish, and Buryat. The local Polish dialect is characterized by influences from Russian and archaic elements, surviving from the dialect spoken by the original settlers. The dialect differs from the language spoken in Poland, however is still understandable by Polish-speakers from Poland. In the village operates school teaching in Polish language. Historically, locally Polish language was written down with Cyrillic alphabet, as opposed to commonly used Latin script, however, in modern day, the Latin script is used instead.

Citations

Notes

References 

Rural localities in Irkutsk Oblast
Polish diaspora in Siberia
1910 establishments in the Russian Empire
Populated places established in 1910